Mobileye Global Inc. is a company developing autonomous driving technologies and advanced driver-assistance systems (ADAS) including cameras, computer chips and software. Mobileye was acquired by Intel in 2017 and went public again in 2022. Mobileye is based in Jerusalem, Israel, and also has sales and marketing offices in Midtown, Manhattan, US; Shanghai, China; Tokyo, Japan; and Düsseldorf, Germany.

History
Mobileye was founded in 1999 by Hebrew University professor Amnon Shashua when he evolved his academic research into a vision system which could detect vehicles using a camera and software algorithms on a processor. Since its establishment, it has developed into a supplier of automotive safety technologies based on adding "intelligence" to inexpensive cameras for commercialization.

Mobileye established its first research center in 2004, and launched the first generation EyeQ1 processor four years later, in 2008. The technology offered driver assistance including AEB (automatic emergency braking). One of the first vehicles to use this technology was the fifth-generation BMW 7 Series. Subsequent versions of the chip were released in 2010, 2014 and 2018.

In 2013, Mobileye announced the sale of a 25% stake to Blue-chip investors for $400 million, valuing the company at approximately $1.5 billion.

Mobileye went public on the New York Stock Exchange in 2014. It raised $890 million, and became the largest Israeli IPO in U.S. history. By the end of the year, Mobileye's technology was implemented in 160 car models made by 18 different OEMs.

In 2017, Mobileye unveiled a mathematical model for safe self-driving cars based on a research paper by CEO Amnon Shashua and VP of Technology Shai Shalev-Shwartz. The paper outlines a system called Responsibility-Sensitive Safety (RSS) which redefines fault and caution and could potentially be used to inform insurance policies and driving laws. Shai Shalev-Shwartz was promoted to CTO in 2019.

In March 2017, Intel announced that it would be acquiring Mobileye for $15.3 billion — the biggest-ever acquisition of an Israeli tech company. Following the acquisition, Reuters reported that the U.S. Securities and Exchange Commission had charged two Israelis, Ariel Darvasi and Amir Waldman, with engaging in insider trading prior to the announcement of the acquisition of Mobileye by Intel. Both had connections to Mobileye through the Hebrew University of Jerusalem, where Mobileye's technology was first developed. Also, the SEC obtained an emergency court order, freezing certain assets of Virginia residents Lawrence F. Cluff, Jr. and Roger E. Shaoul who allegedly used insider information to make approximately $1 million on Intel's purchase of Mobileye. Neither Intel nor Mobileye were accused by the SEC of violating the law.

In October 2018, Mobileye and Volkswagen released plans to commercialize Mobility-as-a-Service (MaaS) in Israel. Mobileye began "robotaxi" trials with Nio electric vehicles in Israel in May 2020 due to a delay in the arrival of Volkswagen minivans, and unveiled its new production-ready robotaxi in 2021 at the IAA Mobility show in Munich.

Mobileye demonstrated an autonomous car equipped only with cameras on the streets of Jerusalem in January 2020, later testing the cars in Munich and New York City.

In December 2021, Intel announced its plan to take Mobileye automotive unit public via an IPO of newly issued stock in 2022, maintaining its majority ownership of the company. In October 2022, Intel offered 5–6% of outstanding shares raising $861million by selling 41million shares, valuing Mobileye at around $17billionmore than what it originally paid in 2017. Intel continued to hold all of Mobileye's Class B shares, giving itself an overall 99.4% of voting power. Mobileye picked the same stock ticker it used prior to the acquisitionMBLYbut on the Nasdaq.

Partnerships 
Mobileye has formed a number of partnerships with automakers. Mobileye launched multiple series productions for LDW on GM Cadillac STS and DTS vehicles, and on BMW 5 and 6 Series vehicles. In 2016, Mobileye and Delphi formed a partnership to develop a near-complete autonomous driving system by 2019. In early 2017, Mobileye announced a partnership with BMW to integrate Mobileye technology into vehicles going to market in 2018. In 2018, Mobileye announced partnerships with BMW, Nissan and Volkswagen. In 2019, Mobileye and NIO announced that they would partner on the development of AVs for consumer markets in China and other major territories. In July 2020, Mobileye and Ford announced a deal in which Mobileye would supply its EyeQ camera-based gear and software across Ford's global product line. Also in 2020, Mobileye announced a partnership with WILLER29 to launch a robotaxi service in Japan, Taiwan and Southeast Asia and with Geely for ADAS. The same year, Intel announced that it had acquired Moovit, a mobility-as-a-service (MaaS) company, to enhance Mobileye's MaaS offering.

In February 2021, Mobileye, Transdev Autonomous Transport System (ATS) and Lohr Group formed a partnership to develop and deploy autonomous shuttles, and in April Mobileye announced a partnership with Udelv on the company's electric self-driving delivery vehicle, called "Transporter", with the goal to begin commercial operations in 2023. In May 2021, Toyota Motor Corp. selected Mobileye and German supplier ZF to develop and supply ADAS for a number of vehicle platforms. Mobileye also began a partnership with Mahindra in 2021.

Tesla 
In August 2015, Tesla Motors announced that it would incorporate Mobileye's technology in Model S cars. Tesla reportedly did not share its plans with Mobileye, and after the first deadly crash of a self-driving Model S with active Autopilot became public in June 2016, Mobileye announced the end of their partnership. The two companies expressed disagreement over what caused the accident, with Mobileye CEO Amnon Shashua claiming that Tesla "was pushing the envelope in terms of safety" and that Autopilot is a "driver assistance system" and not a "driverless system". Mobileye also issued a statement that its systems were not designed to recognize a "lateral turn across path" and would not have those capabilities until 2018.

Technology

EyeQ
The EyeQ system-on-chip (SoC) utilizes a single camera sensor to provide passive/active ADAS and features including automatic emergency braking (AEB), adaptive cruise control (ACC), lane keeping assist(LKA), traffic jam assist (TJA) and forward collision warning (FCW). Mobileye's fifth-generation EyeQ is able to support fully-autonomous (Level 5) vehicles. More than 27 automobile manufacturers utilize EyeQ for their assisted-driving technologies.

Road Experience Management (REM)
Mobileye's Road Experience Management, or REM, uses real-time data from Mobileye-equipped vehicles to build out a global 3D map. The data collected is compressed text that collects about 10 kilobytes per kilometer and compiled in the cloud in a map called Mobileye RoadBook which leverages anonymized, crowdsourced data from vehicle cameras for autonomous navigation and localization. According to Mobileye, REM had mapped more than 7.5 billion kilometers of roads by January 2021.

Responsibility-Sensitive Safety Model (RSS) 
RSS, or the Responsibility-Sensitive Safety Model, is a mathematical model first proposed by Mobileye in 2017 for AV safety. RSS is a formal model for AV decision-making that digitizes the implicit rules of safe driving for AVs to prevent self-driving vehicles from causing accidents. RSS is defined in software.

True Redundancy 
True Redundancy is an integrated system that utilizes data streams from 360-surround view cameras, lidar, and radar for level 4 autonomous driving. This approach first "doubles down" on the computer-vision subsystem before adding a lidar/radar subsystem for redundancy.

Mobileye Supervision 
SuperVision uses EyeQ5 SoC devices processing data from 11 cameras. The system uses cameras only and is designed for Level 2+ cars, and allows for hands-free driving and self-parking capabilities. Geely's Zeekr electric vehicle is equipped with the Mobileye SuperVision ADAS and began road trials in 2021.

Mobileye Drive 
Mobileye Drive is a Level 4 self-driving system. The full sensor suite includes 13 cameras, 3 long-range LiDARs, 6 short-range LiDARs and 6 radars. Mobileye Drive was first fitted to vehicles used for driverless, ride-hailing services in 2021, with plans for public testing in Germany and Israel in 2022.

Aftermarket 
Mobileye's aftermarket vision-based ADAS systems are based on the same core technology as for production models. These systems offer lane departure warning, forward collision warning, headway monitoring and warning, intelligent headlamp control and speed limit indication (tsr). These systems have also been integrated with fleet management systems.

Chips

Comparison

Hardware

See also 
Science and technology in Israel
Economy of Israel
Start-up Nation
OrCam device
Automatic emergency braking
ADAS
Self-driving car

References

External links
 

Vehicle safety technologies
Automotive electronics
Automotive technology tradenames
Israeli brands
Commercial computer vision systems
Applications of artificial intelligence
Software companies of Israel
Software companies established in 1999
Intelligent transportation systems
Warning systems
Companies based in Jerusalem
Companies formerly listed on the New York Stock Exchange
Companies listed on the Nasdaq
Intel acquisitions
Mergers and acquisitions of Israeli companies
Israeli inventions
2017 mergers and acquisitions
1999 establishments in Israel
2014 initial public offerings
2022 initial public offerings